The 1928 Giro di Lombardia was the 24th edition of the Giro di Lombardia cycle race and was held on 3 November 1928. The race started and finished in Milan. The race was won by Gaetano Belloni.

General classification

References

1928
Giro di Lombardia
Giro di Lombardia